is a railway station in Itoigawa, Niigata, Japan, operated by Echigo Tokimeki Railway.

Lines

Station layout

There is only a stairway, with no elevator or escalator. Due to the air pressure generated by passing trains, access to the platform is limited and a protected waiting room with heavy metal doors keep passengers safe from typhoon-like wind. Average daily ridership at this station is approximately 60, mostly students.

Platforms

History
The station opened on December 16, 1912, as part of the Japanese Government Railways (JGR, JNR after 1949). On October 1, 1969, a new Tsutsuishi Station was opened. On April 1, 1987, with the privatization of JNR, JR West took over control of this station.

From this date, Tsutsuishi Station was transferred to the ownership of the third-sector operating company Echigo Tokimeki Railway.

Passenger statistics
In fiscal 2017, the station was used by an average of 23 passengers daily (boarding passengers only).

Surrounding area

Tsutsuishi fishing port
Tsutsuishi Post Office
Isobe Elementary School

Gallery

See also
 List of railway stations in Japan

References

External links

Train timetables 

Railway stations in Niigata Prefecture
Railway stations in Japan opened in 1912
Stations of Echigo Tokimeki Railway
Itoigawa, Niigata